Fred Mustard Stewart (September 17, 1932, Anderson, Indiana – February 7, 2007, New York City) was an American novelist.  His most popular books were The Mephisto Waltz (1969), adapted for the 1971 film of the same name starring Alan Alda; Six Weeks (1976), made into a 1982 film starring Mary Tyler Moore; Century, a New York Times best-seller in 1981; and Ellis Island (1983), which became a CBS mini-series in 1984.

Stewart attended the Lawrenceville School in New Jersey, class of 1950. He graduated from Princeton University in 1954, where he was a member of the Colonial Club.  He originally planned to be a concert pianist, and studied with Eduard Steuermann at the Juilliard School.

Bibliography
Savage Family Saga
The Magnificent Savages (1996): covers 1850s–1860s
The Young Savages (1998): covers 1880s–1890s
The Naked Savages (1999): covers 1897–1929
The Savages in Love and War (2001): covers 1930–1941

The Mephisto Waltz (1969)
The Methuselah Enzyme (1970)
Lady Darlington (1971)
The Mannings (1973)
Star Child (1974)
Six Weeks (1976)
A Rage Against Heaven (0-670-58910-1, 1978): spans the American Civil War, from 1860 to 1871
Century (1981)
Ellis Island (1983)
The Glitter and the Gold (1985)
The Titan (1985)
Pomp and Circumstance (1991)

References

External links
New York Times obituary, Feb. 12, 2007

1932 births
2007 deaths
20th-century American novelists
American male novelists
Princeton University alumni
Writers from Anderson, Indiana
Lawrenceville School alumni
Juilliard School alumni
20th-century American male writers
Novelists from Indiana